Graham is a city in north-central Texas. It is the county seat and largest city of Young County.

History
The site was first settled in 1871 by brothers Gustavus A. and Edwin S. Graham, primary shareholders in the Texas Emigration and Land Company of Louisville, Kentucky.  The brothers moved to Texas after the Civil War, and after buying  in then-vast Young County, helped to revitalize the area, the population of which had become badly depleted during the war.  During that same year as when Graham was settled, the Warren Wagon Train Raid occurred about 12 miles north of the city.  In 1872, the Graham brothers purchased a local saltworks, established the town of Graham, and set up the Graham Land Office. The saltworks were not a profitable venture, as the salt was too expensive to ship, and were closed in a few years.

New families started to arrive, and the brothers began promoting the sale of homesites and doing civic improvements.  A post office opened in 1873, and after Young County reorganized the following year, Graham became the county seat.  The town's newspaper, known as The Graham Leader and still in existence today, was first printed in 1876, the same year that the first temporary courthouse was built.  Other businesses from these early years included a gristmill, sawmill, cotton gin, and brick kiln, two hotels, and several stores.

On February 15, 1877, the city was the site of the organizational meeting of the group that became the Texas and Southwestern Cattle Raisers Association, created to police ranching and put a stop to cattle rustling.  Founding officers included pioneer ranchers James C. Loving (son of Oliver Loving), Col. C. L. (Kit) Carter, and C.C. Slaughter.  A three-story limestone courthouse was built in 1884, and it was replaced by a new courthouse in the early 1930s. The 1884 structure's east door still stands on the courthouse square.  From 1879 to 1896, Graham was the seat of a federal district court overseen by Judge A.P. McCormick; his jurisdiction extended over all of Texas north and west to New Mexico.

Edwin Graham had married Addie Mary Kintner in 1865. They had five children. Throughout the 1870s, they divided their time between Texas and their families back north, but in 1879, with the town flourishing, they moved their wives and children to Graham permanently. Edwin and Addie lived there until 1891, then moved to Spokane, Washington, where Edwin died on May 7, 1899. His body was brought back to Graham for burial. Addie moved back to Graham and became a leading civic booster and philanthropist. In 1921, with her son Malcolm, she set up the Graham Foundation as a continuing fund for the city's growth and improvement. Addie died in 1929; she was responsible for the establishment of the Eden Home for the aged.

By 1900, Graham had incorporated as a town, and railroad service began in 1903, through the Chicago, Rock Island & Texas Railroad, part of the Chicago, Rock Island & Pacific system. In 1921, the Wichita Falls and Southern Railroad, one of the Frank Kell and Joseph A. Kemp properties, extended its line into Graham from Newcastle. The WF&S was abandoned in 1954 and the Rock Island sold its line to the Texas Export Railroad in 1972, but was abandoned just two years later.

The population of Graham grew slowly until 1917, when oil was discovered nearby; the population tripled from 878 in 1900 to 2,544 in 1920. By 1966, Graham had 17 churches, seven schools, a hospital, a radio station, two libraries, three parks, and two newspapers. The population peaked at 9,170 in 1980, and has since gradually declined; it was 8,716 at the 2000 census and 8,518 by the July 2007 estimate.

Geography

Graham, the county seat of Young County, is located in the southeast portion of the county, and has an area of 5.592 sq mi (14.48 km2). Geographically, Graham is located in the western Cross Timbers area of North Texas. Locally, this is known as the western portion of the Palo Pinto Mountains.

Creeks drain the area generally into the Brazos River; Dry Creek on the east side of town flows into Salt Creek towards the south and into the Brazos. Flatrock Creek drains the rural areas to the southeast and also flows into the Brazos just below where Salt Creek enters. Small impoundments located along Flatrock Creek are used for stock tanks and fish ponds.

Lake Graham is located on the Salt Creek in Young County, five miles north of Graham on US 380:
Surface area: 2,444 acres
Maximum depth: 45 feet
Impounded: 1929
Conservation pool elevation: 1,075 ft. msl
Fluctuation: Minimal, sometimes prone to long periods with dropping water levels
Normal clarity: Slightly stained to stained
Reservoir controlling authority: City of Graham, PO Box 1449, Graham, Texas 76450 (940) 549-3322
Aquatic vegetation: Bulrushes, lily pads, smartweed, pondweed
Predominant fish species: Largemouth bass, white and hybrid striped bass, channel catfish, white crappie
Three public boat ramps, one fishing pier, a picnic area, and sites for primitive and improved camping are available, but no boat rentals, marina, nor handicap fishing access is available. A bait shop is located about two miles south of the reservoir on US 380. Shore fishing is limited to the area around the boat ramp on the Eddleman portion of the reservoir and along the US 380 causeways.

Climate

The Twin Mountains are the dominant physical landmark of the city.

Demographics

2020 census

As of the 2020 United States census, there were 8,732 people, 3,470 households, and 2,357 families residing in the city.

2000 census
As of the census of 2000,  8,716 people, 3,391 households, and 2,366 families were residing in the city. The population density was 1,584.8 people/sq mi (611.9/km2). The 3,904 housing units averaged 709.9/sq mi (274.1/km2). The racial makeup of the city was 88.39% White, 1.24% African American, 0.55% Native American, 0.30% Asian, 7.86% from other races, and 1.66% from two or more races. Hispanics or Latinos of any race were 13.41% of the population.

Of the 3,391 households, 32.6% had children under 18 living with them, 55.9% were married couples living together, 10.3% had a female householder with no husband present, and 30.2% were not families. About 27.3% of all households were made up of individuals, and 15.5% had someone living alone who was 65 or older. The average household size was 2.48, and the average family size was 3.01.

In the city, the age distribution was 26.0% under 18, 7.6% from 18 to 24, 25.2% from 25 to 44, 21.5% from 45 to 64, and 19.8% who were 65  or older. The median age was 39 years. For every 100 females, there were 88.4 males. For every 100 females age 18 and over, there were 83.3 males.

The median income for a household in the city was $31,081, and for a family was $38,118. Males had a median income of $30,221 versus $19,574 for females. The per capita income for the city was $16,587. About 13.0% of families and 17.4% of the population were below the poverty line, including 23.0% of those under age 18 and 13.5% of those age 65 or over.

Points of interest

According to a mural on the courthouse depicting the arrival of the Graham brothers, the town square is physically the largest of any in the country.

Graham was one of only a handful of towns in Texas that remained a dry city; as of 2017, the town now sells wine and beer. It still has an operational drive-in theater.

Graham Municipal Airport (ICAO code KRPH), located within city limits, has two paved runways: 3/21 is 5,000 feet long, and 18/36 is 3,317 feet long.

Education
Public schools in the City of Graham are managed by the Graham Independent School District and home to the Graham High School Steers.

In 2010, North Central Texas College established a learning base in Graham. The campus offers a wide range of academic-transfer courses, vocational nursing (LVN), oil and gas production technology, allied health certificate programs, and continuing education programs. Graham ISD and NCTC also have a partnership offering dual-credit courses to high school juniors and seniors.

Notable people

 Owen J. Baggett, the WWII B-24 Liberator crew member, who on March 31, 1943, killed a Japanese pilot in his Zero aircraft while dangling from a parachute, using a .45-caliber M1911 pistol
 Rex Brown, bassist for the heavy metal band Pantera
 Bob Estes, golfer, four-time winner on the PGA Tour
 Frank Shelby Groner (1877-1943), president of College of Marshall
 Bob Lilly, NFL Hall of Fame football player
 William D. McFarlane, U.S. Congressman from 1933 to 1939
 Robert McFarlane, National Security Advisor to President Ronald Reagan
 Dean Smith, 1952 Olympic gold medalist

References

External links

 Graham, Texas Community Website
 City of Graham, Texas Official Website
 City-Data.com Graham, Texas

Cities in Young County, Texas
Cities in Texas
County seats in Texas
Populated places established in 1871
1871 establishments in Texas